Futurama is a 3D platform video game based on the science fiction animated series of the same name. Versions are available for the PlayStation 2 and Xbox, both of which use cel-shading technology. The cutscenes of the game are presented as an entire "lost episode" of Futurama on the DVD of The Beast with a Billion Backs.

Gameplay
Gameplay is a mix of shooting and platforming. As the game progresses, players play as each of four characters: Fry, Bender, Leela and Zoidberg. Fry's levels mostly involve shooter mechanics, as he can use a multitude of guns. Bender's levels are platformer-oriented, while Leela's revolve around hand-to-hand combat. Zoidberg is featured in a short segment as well. There are several Nibblers hidden in each level; collecting them unlocks extras such as movie clips and galleries.

Plot
The game begins with Professor Farnsworth, wearing a sombrero, selling the Planet Express delivery company to Mom, explaining that it had been losing money for years due to mismanagement. The buyout gives Mom ownership of more than fifty percent of Earth, allowing her to become the supreme ruler of Earth. Soon after this, she enslaves humanity.

Finding the ship inexplicably broken, the Professor tasks Leela and Bender with repairing it, and sends Fry off to find a hammer to keep him out of the way. After Fry is crushed to death under a pile of debris, he is resurrected by the Professor's new invention, the Re-animator (which closely resembles a giant toaster), which brings the crew back to life every time they die.

After discovering that the ship's dark matter engine is beyond repair, and informing the crew that the back-up was pawned in exchange for a gun, the Professor sends Fry off to retrieve it, having to travel via the sewers to avoid curfew. After Fry returns, they escape from Earth with Re-animator.

However, Mom pursues them in an effort to capture Farnsworth. She hopes to turn Earth into a giant warship, and Farnsworth is the only person who knows how to build an engine large enough to move the Earth. After Bender frees the ship from a suck beam generated from a desert asteroid, Mom ultimately captures Farnsworth, places his head in a jar, and sends the ship hurtling into the Sun with Fry, Leela, and Bender on board.

After discovering that the Sun is habitable, Leela helps the Sun People to defeat their evil Sun God in exchange for a full tank of dark matter. After Leela destroys the Sun Temple, the crew then head for the planet of Bogad, where Farnsworth's mentor, Adoy, lives. Adoy has invented a time machine, but its generator is inconveniently placed a great distance away, with hazardous swamps in the way. Using the time machine's hand crank, which turns back time by two minutes if cranked for that long, Zoidberg (who had inexplicably appeared on Adoy "making a cameo") manages to reach and activate the generator. Fry, Leela and Bender manage to travel back to a few minutes before Mom buys Planet Express from the Professor. However, the ship crashes into Planet Express, destroying the ship. This prompts them to steal the ship of the past, leaving the broken ship to be repaired by their past selves. They attempt to stop the sale, which prompts Mom to send Destructor to attack them. They defeat the robot, but the Re-animator gets damaged and falls on Destructor, causing it to fall on top of them. Angry at the fact that the robot killed his crew, the professor refuses to sell Planet Express. But after Mom bribes him with a sombrero, he sells, and the events of the game continue in an endless cycle.

Development
Development on the game started before the series' cancellation, but the game was not released until after the last episode of season 4 had already been shown. Thus, the game has been known as a "lost episode" of sorts since it includes 28 minutes of new animation.

Many of the crew from the Futurama series worked on the game. Matt Groening served as Executive game developer and David X. Cohen directed the voice actors. These voice actors were the original actors from the series: Billy West, Katey Sagal, John DiMaggio, Tress MacNeille, Maurice LaMarche, and David Herman. Cast members Phil LaMarr and Lauren Tom weren't included in the game due to budgetary reasons. Also adding to the authenticity of the game was the original music composition provided by Christopher Tyng who also composed the music in the series and Futurama scriptwriter and producer J. Stewart Burns who scripted an original storyline for the plot. The music during the end credits of the game is later used in the four straight-to-DVD Futurama films: in the extended intro of Bender's Big Score, and rearranged versions during the end credits of the subsequent three films.

A GameCube version was planned for release but was cancelled due to slow sales of the console in the United States.

Futurama: The Lost Adventure
The cutscenes, along with some in-game footage provided by Cohen, were compiled into a 30-minute feature titled Futurama: The Lost Adventure (described by Cohen as "the 73rd episode") and included as a special feature with the direct-to-DVD movie Futurama: The Beast with a Billion Backs. With Unique Development Studios having gone out of business, the production team were unable to acquire the original full-quality video files for the cutscenes and instead sourced the footage by recording video from an Xbox console running the game. The Lost Adventure compilation also removes meta references to being a video game and adds new effects to the sound mix.

Reception

Futurama received "mixed" reviews according to video game review aggregator Metacritic. Gameplay was generally considered lackluster, though the cutscenes were described in Wired as "side-splitting". Maxim gave the game a score of six out of ten and said, "It's too bad that clunky controls and eh game play stay forever buried in a time lock of dull sloppiness."

References

External links
 

2003 video games
3D platform games
Cancelled GameCube games
Futurama video games
Gamebryo games
NetImmerse engine games
PlayStation 2 games
Science fiction video games
Single-player video games
Fiction about the Sun
Video games about time travel
Video games based on animated television series
Video games featuring female protagonists
Video games set in the 31st century
Video games set in New York City
Video games set on fictional planets
Video games with cel-shaded animation
Unique Development Studios games
Fox Interactive games
Video games developed in Sweden
Xbox games